The I Scouting Group was a special reconnaissance unit within the German Kaiserliche Marine. The unit was famously commanded by Admiral Franz von Hipper during World War I. The I Scouting Group was one of the most active formations in the High Seas Fleet during the war; the unit took part in every major fleet operation in the North Sea, including the battles of Dogger Bank and Jutland. The unit also saw limited action in the Baltic Sea, including the Battle of the Gulf of Riga.

Ships assigned to the I Scouting Group
 was the first battlecruiser assigned to the I Scouting group. The ship joined the unit on 8 May 1911. On 30 September,  was commissioned into the I Scouting Group, and replaced the old armored cruiser .  joined the unit after she was commissioned on 22 May 1913.  was attached to the unit from August 1914.  was slated to be assigned to the unit by the end of October 1914, but turbine damage delayed the ship from joining the I Scouting Group until 16 November of that year. Derfflingers sistership  joined the unit on 20 March 1916. The third , and final ship to join the I Scouting Group, was assigned to the unit on 6 November 1917. Of the seven true battlecruisers built by the Kaiserliche Marine, only  was not attached to the I Scouting Group, as she was made the flagship of the Mittelmeerdivision in October 1912.

Service history
The I Scouting Group was one of the most active units in the High Seas Fleet during World War I. The ships were used a number of times in attempts to lure out a portion of the British Grand Fleet, where it could be defeated by the whole German battle fleet. Several of these operations called for the ships of the I Scouting Group to bombard the English coast; these included the raid on Yarmouth, the raid on Scarborough, Hartlepool and Whitby, and the bombardment of Yarmouth and Lowestoft. The unit also participated in raids against British naval forces, including the operations that resulted in the Battle of Dogger Bank and the Battle of Jutland.

Footnotes

See also
Imperial German Navy order of battle (1914)

References
 
 
 
 
 

Military units and formations of the Imperial German Navy
Naval units and formations of Germany in World War I